Eagle Newspapers is an American newspaper publisher serving the states of Oregon, Washington and Idaho.

History 
The origins of the company date back to 1933 when Elmo Smith and his wife, Dorothy, borrowed $25 to establish a mimeographed weekly newspaper in Ontario, Oregon. In 1948, Smith sold the paper and used the proceeds to purchase the Blue Mountain Eagle in John Day, Oregon. 

That same year Smith and his friend, Bill Robinson, purchased The Madras Pioneer and the family business was incorporated. In 1961, the company purchased the Hood River News.

The company changed its name to Eagle Newspapers, Inc. in 1979.

In 2013, Eagle Newspapers sold six Oregon newspapers in Central Oregon and the Willamette Valley to the Pamplin Media Group. In 2020, the company sold the Polk County Itemizer-Observer to SJ Olson Publishing, Inc.

Current newspapers
Oregon
 Hood River News
 The Dalles Chronicle

Idaho
 Idaho County Free Press (Grangeville)
Moneysaver (Lewiston, Idaho & Clarkston, Washington; Moscow, Idaho & Pullman, Washington)

Washington
 The Enterprise (White Salmon)
Moneysaver (Lewiston, Idaho & Clarkston, Washington; Moscow, Idaho & Pullman, Washington)

Newspapers formerly published by Eagle
 The Omak-Okanogan County Chronicle (Omak)
 Daily Sun News (Sunnyside)
 Camas-Washougal Post Record
 Canby Herald
 Central Oregonian
 The Madras Pioneer	
 Molalla Pioneer	
 The Newberg Graphic
 Polk County Itemizer-Observer (Dallas)
 Wilsonville Spokesman	
 Woodburn Independent

See also
 List of companies based in Oregon

References

External links
Eagle Newspapers, Inc. (official website)

Publishing companies based in Oregon
Newspaper companies of the United States
Privately held companies based in Oregon